Rocklin may refer to:

Places
Rocklin, California, a city in the United States
Rocklin station 
Rocklin Unified School District
Rocklin High School
Rocklin, Nova Scotia, a community in Canada

People with the surname
Nicole Rocklin, American film producer